The 44th Grand Prix Automobile de Pau (Pau Grand Prix), was the sixth round of the 1984 European Championship for F2 Drivers. This race was held around the streets of the city of Pau, Pyrénées-Atlantiques, south-western France, on 11 June.

Report

Entry
For this round, the entry was down to just 19 cars. Prior to qualifying, the Minardi Team withdrawn an entry, no driver was available.

Qualifying
Mike Thackwell took pole position for Ralt Racing Ltd, in their Ralt-Honda RH6, averaging a speed of 89.922 mph.

Race
The race was held over 73 laps of the Circuit de Pau-Ville. Mike Thackwell took the winner spoils for works Ralt team, driving their Ralt-Honda RH6. The Kiwi won in a time of 1hr 29:39.73mins., averaging a speed of 86.024 mph. Second place went to Frenchman, Philippe Streiff aboard the AGS Elf (Armagnac Bigorre) entered AGS-BMW JH19C, who was over 40 seconds adrift. The podium was completed by the second works Ralt-Honda of Brazilian, Roberto Moreno.

Classification

Race result

 Fastest lap: Mike Thackwell, 1:12.65secs. (87.261 mph)

References

Pau
Pau
Pau Grand Prix